Victor Spinei (born 26 October 1943 in Lozova, Lăpușna County, Romania) is Emeritus Professor of history and archaeology at the Alexandru Ioan Cuza University, member and vice president of the Romanian Academy. He is a specialist on the history of Romania and the Romanian people in the Early and High Middle Ages, the history of migratory peoples in Eastern and Southeastern Europe during this period, and the production and circulation of cult objects in Eastern and Southeastern Europe during the Middle Ages.

Education
In 1961 Spinei graduated from the Costache Negruzzi National College. In 1966 he received a Bachelor of Science in History and Philosophy from the Alexandru Ioan Cuza University, after which he specialised at the Institute for Prehistory and Historical Archaeology from Saarland University (1973–1974). In 1977 he earned a PhD from the Nicolae Iorga Institute of History in Bucharest, under Ștefan Ștefănescu (initially under Ion Nestor at the University of Bucharest).

Career
Between 1966 and 1990 Spinei was a researcher at the A.D. Xenopol Institute of History and Archaeology of the Romanian Academy in Iași. The archaeology section split in 1990, forming the Iași Institute of Archaeology (likewise under the aegis of the Romanian Academy), in which Spinei continued his work until 2012. He was the director of the Iași Institute of Archaeology between 2003 and 2011, and has been an Honorary Director since 2014. Since 2015 he has been a corresponding member of the German Archaeological Institute.

Since 1990 he has been a faculty member at Alexandru Ioan Cuza University in Iași. He has also lectured as guest professor at the Free University of Berlin (Institut für Prähistorische Archäologie), the University of Mainz (Historisches Seminar), the University of Konstanz (Fachbereich: Geschichte und Soziologie), the University of Freiburg (Institut für Archäologische Wissenschaften / Fachbereich: Frühgeschichtliche Archäologie und Archäologie des Mittelalters), and Moldova State University in Chișinău.

Between 2001 and 2015 Spinei was a corresponding member of the Romanian Academy; he became a titular member of the Academy on July 5, 2015, and was elected vice president on November 27, 2015.

He is member of several editorial boards, including Arheologia Moldovei, Dacia, Historia Urbana, Studii și Cercetări de Istorie Veche și Arheologie, Res Historica, and Acta Euroasiatica; he also founded and coordinates several academic book series published by the Alexandru Ioan Cuza University and the Romanian Academy.

Since 2012 he has been a member of the Commission for History and Cultural Studies of the Romanian National Council for Attesting Titles, Diplomas and University Certificates.

Honors and awards (selected)
 Nicolae Iorga Award of the Romanian Academy (1982);
 Doctor Honoris Causa of the Moldova State University, Chișinău (2012);
 Professor Emeritus of the Alexandru Ioan Cuza University of Iași (2012);\
 Order of the Star of Romania, Knight grade (2017).

Selected works

Monographs

In Romanian
 Moldova în secolele XI-XIV, Editura Științifică și Enciclopedică, Bucharest, 1982.
 Spinei, Realități etnice și politice în Moldova Meridională în secolele X-XIII. Români și turanici, Editura Junumea, Iași, 1985.
 Marile migrații din estul și sud-estul Europei în secolele IX-XIII, Editura Institutului European, Iași, 1999.

In English
 Moldavia in the 11th-14th Centuries, Editura Academiei Române, București, 1986.
 The Romanians and the Turkic Nomads North of the Danube Delta from the Tenth to the Mid-Thirteenth Century, Brill, Leiden–Boston, 2009, .

In French
 Les Princes Martyrs Boris et Gleb. Iconographie et Canonisation, Archaeopress, Oxford, 2011, .
 Mongolii și românii în sinteza de istorie ecleziastică a lui Tholomeus din Lucca /  Les Mongols et les Roumains dans la synthèse d’histoire ecclesiastique de Tholomeus de Lucca, Editura Universității “Al. I. Cuza”, Iași, 2012, .

Edited volumes

Studies

References

External links
 Profile on the site of the Romanian Academy
 Profile on the site of the Romanian Academy — Iași branch
 Profile on the site of the Alexandru Ioan Cuza University — Arheoinvest Platform
 Profile on academia.edu

1943 births
Living people
Romanian archaeologists
Romanian writers
Romanian writers in French
People from Strășeni District
Titular members of the Romanian Academy
Academic staff of Alexandru Ioan Cuza University
Alexandru Ioan Cuza University alumni
Costache Negruzzi National College alumni
Saarland University alumni
20th-century Romanian historians
21st-century Romanian historians
20th-century archaeologists
21st-century archaeologists